Esquilache is a 1989 Spanish film directed by Josefina Molina. The film stars Fernando Fernán Gómez as Leopoldo de Gregorio, Marquis of Esquilache. It is based on the play "Un Soñador Para Un Pueblo" by Antonio Buero Vallejo. The film was entered into the 39th Berlin International Film Festival.

Plot
The film is about the Esquilache Riots.

Cast
 Fernando Fernán Gómez as Esquilache
 José Luis López Vázquez as Antonio Campos
 Ángela Molina as Fernanda
 Ángel de Andrés as Marqués de la Ensenada
 Concha Velasco as Pastora Patermo
 Adolfo Marsillach as Carlos III
 Amparo Rivelles as Isabel de Farnesio
 Alberto Closas as Duque de Villasanta
 Tito Valverde as Bernardo

References

External links
 

1989 films
1980s Spanish-language films
1980s biographical drama films
Spanish biographical drama films
Films set in the 1760s
Films set in Madrid
Films directed by Josefina Molina
Fiction set in 1766
Cultural depictions of Spanish kings
1980s Spanish films